Stathmopoda melanochra is a species of moth of the family Stathmopodidae. It is found in Australia and New Zealand.

References

Stathmopodidae
Moths of New Zealand